Parornix acuta is a moth of the family Gracillariidae. It is known from Cyprus, Crete, mainland Italy, Sicily and North Macedonia.

References

Parornix
Moths of Europe
Moths described in 1980